The Eastman E-2 Sea Rover, also called the Beasley-Eastman E-2 Sea Rover, was a light seaplane built in the late 1920s for business and shuttle use.

Development

The E-2 was designed by former Ford engineer Thomas Towle for industrialist Jim Eastman of Eastman Laboratories. Towle was in the process of starting his own company, the Towle Marine Aircraft Engineering to produce his twin-engine amphibian design, the Towle WC. Eastman founded the Eastman Aircraft Corporation of Detroit to build the E-2 

The prototype E-2 was flown with a single  Anzani 6 engine. The production model was outfitted with a  Warner Scarab. The E-2 received type certificate #338 on 17 July 1930  By the end of 1929 Eastman Aircraft had been merged into the Detroit Aircraft Corporation.

Design
The E-2 used a wooden hull with aluminium cladding. The aircraft used a parasol wing supported by large V-struts with secondary lower shoulder wings with tip floats at the ends. The single engine was mounted in the center of the wing root of the upper wing with a rear teardrop fairing.

Variants
E-2 Sea Rover
Flying boat powered variously by,  Anzani 6,  Warner Scarab and other engines of similar power. Eighteen aircraft were built
E-2A Sea Pirate
Two E-2 flying boats converted to amphibians, powered by  Curtiss Challenger engines.
E-2D Sea Pirate
A single E-2 flying boat, converted to amphibian, powered by a  Packard DR-980 diesel radial engine.

Operators
Gorst Air Transport operated one E-2 from 1929-1930.

Aircraft on display
An E-2 is on display at the British Columbia Aviation Museum. It is a composite made up of the wreckages three E-2s recovered throughout British Columbia.

Specifications (Eastman E-2 Sea Rover)

References

Bibliography

External links

No. 9096. Eastman E-2 Sea Rover (NC466M c/n 11)

Flying boats
1920s United States civil aircraft
E-2
Sesquiplanes
Single-engined tractor aircraft
Aircraft first flown in 1928